Jōmō Shimbun (上毛新聞) is the largest general circulation daily newspaper based in Gunma prefecture, Japan. 
It was established in 1887 and has a circulation of 280,320.

Hideo Yokoyama, a novelist, had worked for the Jōmō Shimbun as a journalist for 12 years.

References

External links
上毛新聞社 raijin.com

1887 establishments in Japan
Publications established in 1887
Japanese-language newspapers
Daily newspapers published in Japan
Newspaper companies of Japan